A bulletin board (pinboard, pin board, noticeboard, or notice board in British English) is a surface intended for the posting of public messages, for example, to advertise items wanted or for sale, announce events, or provide information. Bulletin boards are often made of a material such as cork to facilitate addition and removal of messages, as well as a writing surface such as blackboard or whiteboard. A bulletin board which combines a pinboard (corkboard) and writing surface is known as a combination bulletin board. Bulletin boards can also be entirely in the digital domain and placed on computer networks so people can leave and erase messages for other people to read and see, as in a bulletin board system.

Bulletin boards are particularly prevalent at universities. They are used by many sports groups and extracurricular groups and anything from local shops to official notices. Dormitory corridors, well-trafficked hallways, lobbies, and freestanding kiosks often have cork boards attached to facilitate the posting of notices. At some universities, lampposts, bollards, trees, and walls often become impromptu posting sites in areas where official boards are sparse in number.

Internet forums are a replacement for traditional bulletin boards. Online bulletin boards are sometimes referred to as message boards. The terms bulletin board, message board and even Internet forum are interchangeable, although often one bulletin board or message board can contain a number of Internet forums or discussion groups. An online board can serve the same purpose as a physical bulletin board.

Magnet boards, or magnetic bulletin boards, are a popular substitute for cork boards because they lack the problem of board deterioration from the insertion and removal of pins over time.

History 

 1801: James Pillans, headmaster and geography teacher at the Old High School in Edinburgh, Scotland, is credited with inventing the first modern blackboard.
 1925: George Brooks of Topeka, Kansas is issued a patent for the use of corkboard as a bulletin board which you could stick tacks into. The patent for George Brooks' invention, which would become a mainstay in homes and offices around the world, expired in 1941, which then allowed anyone to create and market their own versions of the product.
 1940: George E. Fox, received a patent for a foam rubber pinboard with cardboard backing
 1959: W.F. Lewis is issued a patent for a combined chalkboard and bulletin board.
 1976: The concept of the bulletin board entered the information age when software developers Ward Christensen and Randy Suess launched the first public dialup bulletin board system.
 2006: High resolution digital bulletin board system first proposed by Dr. Pumpernickel
 2010: Digital signage displays started to replace bulletin boards as a means to reduce clutter and provide real-time information.
 2010: Pinterest, a content and photo-sharing website meant to serve as online personal bulletin boards, is founded by Ben Silbermann, Paul Sciarra and Evan Sharp.
 2017: General Enchantment is issued a utility patent for a physical electronic bulletin board system, that includes a physical writing or pinning surface and an electronic display, like a mobile computing device (tablet computer), capable of running (digital signage) software that augments the sharing of analogue information with digital content.

See also

 Community bulletin board
 Digital signage
 Wall newspaper

References

Office equipment
Mass media technology
Academia